Richard Twist was an English professional association footballer who played as a goalkeeper. He played in The Football League for Burnley and Preston North End, making 13 league appearances in total.

References

English footballers
Association football goalkeepers
Burnley F.C. players
Preston North End F.C. players
English Football League players
Year of birth missing
Year of death missing